"These Dreams of You" is a song written by the Northern Irish singer-songwriter Van Morrison on his 1970 album Moondance. It was also included on his 1974 live album, It's Too Late to Stop Now.

"The inspiration of "These Dreams of You", it seems, was a dream about an assassination attempt on Ray Charles, who then 'got up to do his best'. The words are introspective and obscure, but the musical structure and assured playing give the piece its necessary coherence."

Van Morrison describes it as:

The result of a dream I had about Ray Charles being shot down. That started off the whole song. The line 'you paid your dues in Canada', I don't really know where that comes from, I just have a romantic image of going to Canada and that's about it. The song is basically about dreams.

Brian Hinton goes on to say, "Nightmares  more like, with Van's lover telling lies, walking out, ignoring his cries, throwing him out, and slapping him on the face; odd behavior for an angel.  Van's voice sounds almost strangled on the final chorus."

Appearance on other albums
A live version was included in the 1974 double live album It's Too Late to Stop Now.

Filmed performances
There is footage of the song being performed at the Fillmore East on 23 September 1970.
A performance of the song, with special guest Fred Wesley, was shown on the 1998 Rockpalast Christmas special on German television.

Personnel on original release
Van Morrison – vocals, harmonica
John Klingberg – bass guitar
Jeff Labes – organ
Gary Mallaber – drums
John Platania – guitar
Jack Schroer – alto saxophone
Collin Tilton – tenor saxophone

Notes

References
Collis, John (1996). Inarticulate Speech of the Heart, Little Brown and Company, 
Hinton, Brian (1997). Celtic Crossroads: The Art of Van Morrison, Sanctuary, 

1969 songs
Van Morrison songs
Songs written by Van Morrison
Song recordings produced by Lewis Merenstein
Song recordings produced by Van Morrison